AADM may refer to:

 Aniruddha's Academy of Disaster Management, a non-profit organization focuses on disaster management
 American Academy of Disaster Medicine, organization promoting the science and art of disaster healthcare